is a Japanese footballer. He currently plays for Giravanz Kitakyushu in the J. League.

Club career stats
Updated to 23 February 2017.

References

External links
Profile at Giravanz Kitakyushu
Profile at Omiya Ardija

1986 births
Living people
Hosei University alumni
Association football people from Saitama Prefecture
Japanese footballers
J1 League players
J2 League players
J3 League players
Omiya Ardija players
Kataller Toyama players
Giravanz Kitakyushu players
Association football defenders